Collision Course is the sixth album by American country band Asleep at the Wheel. Produced by Joel Dorn at Regent Sound Studios in New York City, it was released in June 1978 as the group's fourth and final studio album on Capitol Nashville. After 1977's The Wheel featured all original material, Collision Course features only two tracks written by members of the band. The remaining recordings are covers of compositions originally by popular Western swing, Cajun and jazz artists.

Asleep at the Wheel's sixth album marks the last release by several members of the band as full-time members, including co-founder and main songwriter LeRoy Preston, pianist since the group's debut Floyd Domino, and bassist of five albums Tony Garnier. Collision Course was also the band's first release produced by Joel Dorn, the first recorded in New York, and the last studio album for Capitol; after their live debut Served Live the following year, the group would sign with MCA Records.

Collision Course was the band's fourth album to register on the US Billboard Top Country Albums chart, reaching number 46. It was also their first to chart outside of the United States, peaking at number 19 on the Canadian RPM Country Albums chart. The album was praised by critics for its mix of genres, including blues, swing, jazz, Cajun and boogie-woogie. The band's recording of Count Basie's "One O'Clock Jump" won the Grammy Award for Best Country Instrumental Performance.

Background
After working with producer Tommy Allsup for all but one of their first five albums, Asleep at the Wheel recorded Collision Course with producer Joel Dorn for the first time, tracking the album at Regent Sound Studios in New York City, New York starting in late 1977. The album was completed early the next year and originally scheduled for release on May 8, 1978, although it was ultimately issued in mid–late June. "Louisiana" was released as the first single from the album in July, followed by "Texas Me & You" in November. The latter spent four weeks at the end of 1978 on the US Billboard Hot Country Singles chart, peaking at number 75.

Collision Course was recognised by commentators upon its release for displaying a more jazz-orientated sound than the band's previous releases. Shortly after the album's release, vocalist and rhythm guitarist LeRoy Preston, pianist Floyd Domino and fiddler Bill Mabry all left Asleep at the Wheel, with Johnny Nicholas joining on guitar, piano and vocals. Domino was reportedly the first to leave, following a "falling out" with frontman Ray Benson. The pianist, whose then-wife was also the manager of the group, claimed that "We had a big blowout when I left. When you battle with Ray, there are no time-outs. But there are also no hard feelings."

Reception

Commercial
Collision Course did not reach the US Billboard 200, but registered at number 10 on the Bubbling Under chart. On the Top Country Albums chart it peaked at number 46, 13 places lower than 1977's The Wheel. In other publications, the album reached number 171 on the Cash Box albums chart, number 29 on the publication's country albums chart, number 174 on the Record World albums chart, and number 14 on the magazine's country albums chart. Collision Course was the band's first album to chart outside of the US, reaching number 19 on the Canadian RPM country albums chart.

Critical

Critical reviews of Collision Course were generally positive. In an uncredited review, Cash Box magazine noted that "Despite the group's name, its latest album is a wide awake effort which should help liven up everything from radio playlists to parties," praising the range of musical styles on the album and describing it as "100% fun". Similarly, Record World claimed that "The Wheel continues to progress musically with blues, jazz, country and much more with a style all their own," highlighting in particular the recordings of Randy Newman's "Louisiana", J.R. Chatwell's "Pipe Dreams" and Naomi Neville's "Ruler of My Heart". Robert Christgau awarded Collision Course a B− rating, his lowest for the band to date, which he credited to the lack of original material on the album. He described the majority of tracks as "nice, rarely more".

Accolades
Collision Course spawned Asleep at the Wheel's first Grammy Award, winning Best Country Instrumental Performance for its recording of Count Basie's "One O'Clock Jump".

Track listing

Personnel

Asleep at the Wheel
Ray Benson – lead guitar, vocals, design concept
Chris O'Connell – rhythm guitar, percussion, vocals
LeRoy Preston – rhythm guitar, percussion, vocals
Lucky Oceans – pedal steel guitar
Tony Garnier – upright and electric basses
Floyd Domino – piano, organ
Chris York – drums
Danny Levin – fiddle, mandolin
Bill Mabry – fiddle
Link Davis Jr. – tenor and baritone saxophones, Cajun accordion, vocals
Pat "Taco" Ryan – alto, tenor and baritone saxophones, flute, clarinet

Additional personnel
Andy Stein – baritone saxophone, fiddle
Delores Hall – backing vocals
Benny Diggs – backing vocals
Arthur Lee Freeman – backing vocals
Phillip Ballou – backing vocals
Joel Dorn – production
Kathy Tufaro – production assistance
Vince McGarry – engineering, mixing
Michael Priest – artwork, design
Guy Juke – artwork colouring

Charts

References

External links

Asleep at the Wheel albums
1978 albums
Capitol Records albums
Albums produced by Joel Dorn